Erected in 1922, the Lazaretto Point War Memorial (known colloquially as the Lazaretto Memorial) is located in the Scottish village of Ardnadam in Argyll and Bute. It stands, at the apex of sharp bend in the A815, around the midpoint of the southern shores of the Holy Loch.

It was designed by Boston, Menzies & Morton, of Greenock, and unveiled on 14 May 1922. It commemorates the local soldiers who died during service in World War I and World War II.

Mrs John Brown, of nearby Sandbank, performed the unveiling. Five of her sons served in the conflicts, one of whom was killed in action. Reverend A. MacDonald M.A., also of Sandbank, officiated at the ceremony.

Plaque detail

References 

Cenotaphs in the United Kingdom
British military memorials and cemeteries
1922 sculptures
Stone sculptures in the United Kingdom
Outdoor sculptures in Scotland
Monuments and memorials in Scotland
Buildings and structures in Argyll and Bute
World War I memorials in Scotland
World War II memorials in Scotland
1923 establishments in Scotland